Mischocarpus lachnocarpus, the woolly brush apple, is a rainforest tree, mostly seen in tropical north eastern Queensland, Australia.

References

Sapindaceae
Sapindales of Australia
Trees of Australia
Flora of Queensland
Flora of New South Wales
Flora of Papua New Guinea